A railway museum is a museum that explores the history of all aspects of rail related transportation,  including: locomotives (steam, diesel, and electric), railway cars, trams, and railway signalling equipment. They may also operate historic equipment on museum grounds.

Africa

Egypt
Egypt's Railway Museum (Cairo)

Kenya
Nairobi Railway Museum in Nairobi

Nigeria
NRC/Legacy Railway Museum in Lagos

Sierra Leone
Sierra Leone National Railway Museum in Freetown

South Africa
Outeniqua Transport Museum in George

Sudan
 Railway Museum in Atbarah

Zambia
Railway Museum in Livingstone

Zimbabwe
Bulawayo Railway Museum in Bulawayo

Asia

China 

Chan T'ien-yu Memorial Hall, Badaling, Beijing
China Railway Museum, Beijing
Da'anbei Railway Station, Da'an, Jilin Province
Hong Kong Railway Museum
Qingdao-Jinan Railway Museum, Jinan, Shandong Province
Shanghai Railway Museum, Shanghai
Shenyang Railway Museum, Shenyang, Liaoning Province
Wuhan Metro Museum, Wuhan, Hubei Province
Yunnan Railway Museum, Kunming, Yunnan Province

India 
Coochbehar Railway Museum. Coochbehar, West Bengal
Ghum Railway Museum, Ghum, West Bengal
Heritage Rail Museum, Bhusawal
Rewari Railway Heritage Museum, Rewari, Haryana
Joshi's Museum of Miniature Railway, Pune, Maharashtra
Kanpur Sangrahalaya, Kanpur, Uttar Pradesh
Gorakhpur Rail Museum, Gorakhpur, Uttar Pradesh,
Rail Museum, Howrah, Kolkata, West Bengal
Mysore Rail Museum, Mysore, Karnataka
Railway Museum, Hubli Junction railway station, Hubballi, Karnataka
National Rail Museum, New Delhi

Patel Chowk Metro Museum, Patel Chowk metro station, New Delhi
Smaranika Tram Museum, Esplanade, West Bengal
Railway Heritage Centre, Tiruchirappalli, Tamil Nadu
Regional Railway Museum, Chennai, Tamil Nadu

Indonesia 

 Indonesian Railway Museum of Ambarawa, Central Java
 Bondowoso Rail and Train Museum, Bondowoso Regency, East Java
 Museum of Transport of Taman Mini Indonesia Indah, Jakarta
 Sawahlunto Rail and Train Museum, Sawahlunto, West Sumatra

Israel 
 Turkish Railway Station, Beersheba (South)
 Historic Railway Station, Afula (North)
 Israel Railway Museum, Haifa (National and North)
 Jaffa Railway Station, Tel Aviv (Center)
 Kfar Yehoshua Railway Station (North)

Japan 

 Katakami Heritage Railway, in Misaki, Okayama
 Keio Rail-Land, in Hino, Tokyo
 Kyoto Railway Museum, in Shimogyō-ku, Kyoto
 Kyushu Railway History Museum, in Kitakyushu, Fukuoka
 Ome Railway Park, in Ome, Tokyo
 Otaru City General Museum, in Otaru, Hokkaido
 Railway Museum in Saitama, Saitama
 Romance Car Museum in Kanagawa
 SCMaglev and Railway Park in Nagoya
 Shikoku Railway Cultural Center, in Saijō, Ehime
 Subway Museum, in Edogawa, Tokyo
 Tobu Museum, in Sumida, Tokyo
 Tsuyama Railroad Educational Museum, in Tsuyama, Okayama
 Usui Pass Railway Heritage Park, in Annaka, Gunma

Closed museums
 Modern Transportation Museum next to Bentencho Station, Minato-ku, Osaka (closed 2014)
 Sakuma Rail Park, in Hamamatsu, Shizuoka (closed 2009)

Jordan 
Hedjaz Jordan Railway Museum, Amman

North Korea 
 Pyongyang Railway Museum

Pakistan 
Pakistan Railways Heritage Museum

Saudi Arabia
Hejaz Railway Museum

South Korea

Korea Railroad Museum
Sumjingang Railroad Village in Gokseung County

Sri Lanka
 National railway museum, Kadugannawa

Taiwan
 Changhua Roundhouse in Changhua
 Hamasen Museum of Taiwan Railway in Kaohsiung
 Miaoli Railway Museum in Miaoli
 National Railway Museum in Taipei (opening in 2026)
 Taiwan High Speed Rail Museum in Zhongli, Taoyuan
 Takao Railway Museum in Kaohsiung

Thailand
 Railway Outdoor Museum, Bangkok
 Thailand-Burma Railway Centre, Kanchanaburi
 Train Cemetery, Bangkok

Turkey 
Atatürk's Residence and Railway Museum, Ankara
Çamlık Railway Museum, Selçuk, İzmir Province
Istanbul Railway Museum, Istanbul
İzmir Railway Museum, İzmir
Rahmi M. Koç Museum, Istanbul
TCDD Open Air Steam Locomotive Museum, Ankara

Uzbekistan
Railway Museum

Vietnam
Heritage Railway, Da Lat Railway Station

Europe

Austria 
 

 Austrian Railway Museum at Vienna
 Railway and Mining Museum Ampflwang in Upper Austria
 Railway Museum Sigmundsherberg in Lower Austria
 Southern Railway Museum in Mürzzuschlag
 Strasshof Railway Museum in Lower Austria

Belarus 
Baranovichy Railway Museum
Brest Railway Museum

Belgium 
Chemin de Fer à vapeur des Trois Vallées
Dendermonde–Puurs Steam Railway
Patrimoine Ferroviaire et Tourisme
Stoomcentrum Maldegem
Train World

Bulgaria 
National Transport Museum, Bulgaria

Czech Republic 

Czech Railway Museum at Lužná (Rakovník District)
National Technical Museum (Prague)
Railway Museum KHKD at Kněževes
Railway Museum Jaroměř at Jaroměř (Železniční muzeum výtopna Jaroměř)

Denmark 
Bornholm Narrow Gauge Railway Museum
Danish Railway Museum
Djursland Railway Museum
Skjoldenæsholm Tram Museum
Struer Railway Museum

Estonia 

Estonian Railway Museum

Finland 

Finnish Railway Museum
Jokioinen Museum Railway
Savo Railway Museum

France 
Cité du Train
Musée des tramways à vapeur et des chemins de fer secondaires français

Germany 

Augsburg Railway Park, Augsburg, Bavaria
Bahnbetriebswerk Hermeskeil, Hermeskeil, Rhineland-Palatinate
Bavarian Localbahn Society, Bayerisch Eisenstein, Bavaria
Bavarian Railway Museum, Nördlingen, Bavaria
Bochum Dahlhausen Railway Museum, Bochum, North Rhine-Westphalia
Dampfbahn Fränkische Schweiz, Ebermannstadt, Bavaria
Darmstadt-Kranichstein Railway Museum, Darmstadt-Kranichstein, Hesse
DB Museum, Nuremberg, Bavaria
DBK Historic Railway, Crailsheim, Baden-Württemberg
Deutsches Museum, Munich, Bavaria
Dieringhausen Railway Museum, Dieringhausen, North Rhine-Westphalia
Dresden Transport Museum, Dresden, Saxony
Eisenbahnfreunde Zollernbahn, Rottweil, Baden-Württemberg
Franconian Museum Railway, Nuremberg, Bavaria
Frankfurt City Junction Line, Frankfurt, Hesse
Freilassing Locomotive World, Freilassing, Bavaria
German Museum of Technology (Berlin)
German Railway Society, Bruchhausen-Vilsen, Lower Saxony
German Steam Locomotive Museum, Neuenmarkt-Wirsberg, Bavaria
Hannoversches Straßenbahn-Museum, Hanover, Lower Saxony
Historic Railway, Frankfurt, Frankfurt, Hesse
Mellrichstadt-Fladungen railway, Fladungen, Bavaria
Munich Steam Locomotive Company, Munich, Bavaria
Neustadt/Weinstraße Railway Museum, Neustadt an der Weinstrasse, Rhineland-Palatinate
Nuremberg Transport Museum, Nuremberg, Bavaria
Railway Vehicle Preservation Society, Stuttgart, Baden-Württemberg
Rügen Railway & Technology Museum, Prora, Mecklenburg-Western Pomerania
Saxon Railway Museum, Chemnitz, Saxony
Selfkantbahn, Gangelt, North Rhine-Westphalia
Sinsheim Auto & Technik Museum, Sinsheim, Baden-Württemberg
South German Railway Museum, Heilbronn, Baden-Württemberg
Stuttgart Straßenbahn Museum Zuffenhausen, Stuttgart, Baden-Württemberg
Technik Museum Speyer, Speyer, Rhineland Palatinate
Traditionsbetriebswerk Staßfurt, Stassfurt, Saxony-Anhalt
Ulmer Eisenbahnfreunde, Ulm, Baden-Württemberg

Greece 
Railway Museum of Athens
Railway Museum of Thessaloniki

Hungary 

Hungarian Railway Museum
Millennium Underground Museum
Transport Museum of Budapest

Ireland 
Donegal Railway Centre
Steam Museum, Straffan
Whitehead Railway Museum

Italy 

 Costituendo Musero Ferroviario di Primolano, Primolano, Vicenza
 Museo delle Industrie e del Lavoro del Saronnese, Saronno, Varese
 Museo Europeo dei Trasporti Ogliari, Ranco, Varese
 Museo Ferroviario di Trieste Campo Marzio, Trieste
 Museo Ferroviario Piemontese, Savigliano, Turin
 Museo Nazionale dei Trasporti, La Spezia
 Museo Nazionale Ferroviario di Pietrarsa, Naples
 Museo Nazionale Scienza e Tecnologia Leonardo da Vinci, Milan

Latvia 
Latvian Railway History Museum

Luxembourg 
Train 1900

Netherlands
Noord-Nederlands Trein & Tram Museum
het Spoorwegmuseum
Stoom Stichting Nederland
Stoomtrein Goes - Borsele
Museumstoomtram Hoorn-Medemblik
Stoomtrein Valkenburgse Meer
Veluwsche Stoomtrein Maatschappij
Zuid-Limburgse Stoomtrein Maatschappij
Stichting Stadskanaal Rail
Museum Buurtspoorweg

Norway 
Norwegian Railway Museum, Hamar
Oslo Tramway Museum, Oslo
Trondheim Tramway Museum

Poland 
Narrow Gauge Railway Museum in Sochaczew
Narrow Gauge Railway Museum in Wenecja
Railway and Industry Museum in Jaworzyna Śląska (Muzeum Przemysłu i Kolejnictwa w Jaworzynie Śląskiej), Lower Silesian Voivodeship
Railway Museum in Chabówka village, near Rabka, Nowy Targ County
Railway Museum in Kościerzyna, Pomeranian Voivodeship
Roundhouse Skierniewice in Skierniewice
Warsaw Railway Museum (Muzeum Kolejnictwa w Warszawie)
Wolsztyn Steam Locomotive Roundhouse, the only depot in Europe with everyday scheduled passenger trains driven by steam locomotives

Portugal 
National Railway Museum Foundation, Entroncamento

Museum Branches of FMNF 
 Arco de Baúlhe
 Bragança
 Chaves
 Lagos
 Lousado
 Macinhata do Vouga
 Nine
 Santarém
 Valença

Disused or Closed Museums 
 Braga
 Estremoz

Museological Warehouses
 Barreiro
 Estremoz
 Livração
 Pampilhosa
 Peso da Régua
 Pocinho
 Sernada do Vouga
 Tua

Romania
Reșița Steam Locomotive Museum
Sibiu Steam Locomotives Museum

Russia 
 Museum for Railway Technology Novosibirsk at Seyatel station
 Museum of the Moscow Railway (Paveletskaya station), Moscow
 Rizhsky Rail Terminal, Moscow
 Russian Railway Museum, Saint Petersburg
 Railway museum at Nizhny Novgorod
 Railway museum at Pereslavl-Zalessky (narrow gauge)
 Railway museum at Rostov-on-Don
 Railway museum at Yekaterinburg

Serbia 
 Narrow Gauge Museum in Pozega
Railway Museum in Belgrade

Slovenia 
Slovenian Railway Museum

Spain 

 Basque Railway Museum
 Gijón Railway Museum (Museo del Ferrocarill de Asturias)
 Railway Centre and Museum in Móra la Nova (Centre d'Interpretació del Ferrocarril de Móra la Nova)
 Railway Museum in Ponferrada (Museo del Ferrocarril)
 Railway Museum in Madrid (Museo del Ferrocarril)
 Railway Museum in Monforte de Lemos (Museo del Ferrocarril de Galicia)
 Railway Museum in Vilanova (Museu del Ferrocarril de Vilanova)(Vilanova Railway Museum)

Sweden 
Åmål-Årjäng Railway Society, Åmål
Anten-Gräfsnäs Narrow-Gauge Steam Railway, Lake Anten
Dalara and Western Farmlands Railway, Åmål
Eastern Götland Railway Museum, Linköping
Eastern Southernlands Railway, Mariefred
Gothenburg Nostalgia Tram, Gothenburg
Gotland Railway Association, Dalhem
Grängesberg Regional Railway Museum, Grängesberg
Hagfors Railway Museum, Hagfors
Järdaås Pine Forest Railway, Jädraås
Kristiantown Regional Museum, Kristianstad
Landeryd's Railway Museum, Landeryd
Nässjö Railway Museum (in Swedish), Nässjö
Nora Mining District Historical Railway, Nora
Northbottom's Railway Museum, Luleå
Nynäshamn's Railway Museum, Nynäshamn
Railway Museum of Ängelholm, Ängelholm
Skara-Lundsbrunn Railways, Skara
Stockholm Streetcar Museum, Stockholm
Swedish National Railway Museum, Gävle
Upsala-Lenna Jernväg, Uppsala

Switzerland 

Blonay–Chamby Museum Railway

Ukraine
Kiev Railway Museum
Museum of History and Development of Donetsk Railway in Donetsk
Museum of History and Technology of Southern Railway in Kharkiv

United Kingdom

North America

Canada

Costa Rica 
Museo Del Ferrocarril

Guatemala 

 Guatemala City Railway Museum
 Quetzaltenango

Honduras 
 El Progreso railway museum, Yoro

Mexico 
Ferrocarril Interoceánico
Old Railway Station and Railway Museum

United States

Oceania

Australia 
 Archer Park Rail Museum
 Canberra Railway Museum
 Dorrigo Steam Railway & Museum
 Lachlan Valley Railway
 National Railway Museum, Port Adelaide, Port Adelaide
 Newport Railway Museum, Champion Road, North Williamstown
 NSW Rail Museum, Thirlmere
 Rail Motor Society, Paterson
 Railway Museum, Bassendean, Western Australia
 Richmond Vale Railway Museum
 Rosewood Railway Museum, Rosewood
 Steamtown Heritage Rail Centre
 The Workshops Rail Museum, Ipswich, Queensland
 Valley Heights Locomotive Depot Heritage Museum

New Zealand

South America

Argentina 
 Ferroclub Argentino: Centros de Preservacion Remedios de Escalada, Lynch y Tolosa
 Museo Ferroviario de la ciudad de Campana (Buenos Aires)

Brazil 
Araraquara Railway Museum
Jaguariuna Railway Museum
Juiz de Fora Railway Museum (pt)
Museu of Train of Rio de Janeiro
Paranapiacaba Technologic Railway Museum
Rio Claro Railway Museum (future)

Peru 
National Railway Museum (Peru)

See also 

 List of railway museums in the United Kingdom
 List of New Zealand railway museums and heritage lines

References 

 
Museum
 *List of railway museums